Rivera Peaks is a wedge-shaped range of peaks, 14 nautical miles (26 km) long, between Swann Glacier and Watson Peaks, in Palmer Land. Mapped by United States Geological Survey (USGS) from surveys and U.S. Navy air photos in 1961-67 and named by Advisory Committee on Antarctic Names (US-ACAN) for James P. Rivera, electronics technician at South Pole Station in 1967.
 

Mountains of Palmer Land